Elections to Tower Hamlets London Borough Council were held in May 1986.  The whole council was up for election. Turnout was 35.0%.

Election result

|}

Results

References

1986
1986 London Borough council elections
20th century in the London Borough of Tower Hamlets